A Life for the Tsar is a "patriotic-heroic tragic opera" in four acts with an epilogue by Mikhail Glinka. During the Soviet era the opera was known under the name Ivan Susanin.

The original Russian libretto, based on historical events, was written by Nestor Kukolnik, Egor Fyodorovich (von) Rozen, Vladimir Sollogub and Vasily Zhukovsky. It premiered on 27 November 1836 OS (9 December NS) at the Bolshoi Kamenny Theatre in St. Petersburg. The historical basis of the plot involves Ivan Susanin, a patriotic hero of the early 17th century who died in the expulsion of the invading Polish army for the newly elected Tsar Michael of Russia, the first of the Romanov dynasty, elected in 1613.

History

Composition history
The plot of A Life for the Tsar had been used earlier in 1815, when Catterino Cavos, an Italian-Russian composer, had written a two-act singspiel with the same subject and title.  The original title of the opera was to be Ivan Susanin, after the hero, but when Nicholas I attended a rehearsal, Glinka changed the title to A Life for the Tsar as an ingratiating gesture.  This title was retained in the Russian Empire.

In 1924, under the new Soviet administration, it appeared under the title Hammer and Sickle, but that production was not successful and was shelved. On 26 February 1939 it reappeared under the title Glinka had originally chosen, Ivan Susanin.

Glinka and the writers with whom he was associated chose, in Susanin, a hero of Russian nationalism well suited to the mood of the time. The opera was immediately hailed as a great success, and became the obligatory season-opener in the Imperial Russian opera theaters. A Life for the Tsar occupies an important position in Russian musical theater as the first native opera to win a permanent place in the repertoire. It was one of the first Russian operas to be known outside Russia.

Performance history
The opera was given its premiere performance on 27 November 1836 in Saint Petersburg conducted by Catterino Cavos with set designs by Andreas Roller. It was followed several years later  with its premiere in Moscow on 7 September (Old Style) 1842 in a new production with sets by Serkov and Shenyan.

Glinka's opera was featured heavily throughout the Romanov tercentenary celebrations in 1913. It was performed in a gala performance at the Marinsky Theatre, Schools, regiments, and amateur companies throughout imperial Russia staged performances of A Life for the Tsar. Pamphlets and the penny press printed the story of Susanin "ad nauseam", and one newspaper told how Susanin had showed each and every soldier how to fulfill his oath to the sovereign. The image of the seventeenth-century peasant features prominently at the bottom of the Romanov Monument in Kostroma, where a female personification of Russia gives blessings to a kneeling Susanin. In Kostroma, Tsar Nicholas II was even presented with a group of Potemkin peasants who claimed to be descendants of Susanin.

Publication history
1857, piano-vocal score, as A Life for the Tsar, Stellovsky, St. Petersburg
1881, full score, as A Life for the Tsar, Stellovsky, St. Petersburg
1907, new edition by Rimsky-Korsakov and Glazunov, Belyayev, Leipzig
1942, as Ivan Susanin, Muzgiz
1949, as Ivan Susanin, Muzgiz
1953, as Ivan Susanin, Muzgiz

Influences
In keeping with Glinka's European training, much of A Life for the Tsar was structured according to conventional Italian and French models of the period.  Nevertheless, several passages in the opera are based on Russian folk songs or folk melodic idioms that become a full part of the musical texture.

Most importantly, this opera laid the foundation for the series of Russian nationalistic historical operas continued by works such as Serov's Rogneda, Mussorgsky's Boris Godunov, Rimsky-Korsakov's Maid of Pskov, Tchaikovsky's The Oprichnik or Mazeppa, and Borodin's Prince Igor.

Roles

Performance practice
As popular as the opera was, its monarchist libretto was an embarrassment to the Soviet state. After some unsuccessful attempts were made to remedy this situation, in 1939 the poet S. M. Gorodetsky rewrote the text to remove references to the Tsar and otherwise make the libretto politically palatable.

Synopsis
Time: The autumn of 1612 and the winter of 1613.

Act 1
The village of Domnino

Antonida is eager to marry Sobinin, but her father, Susanin, refuses permission until a Russian has been duly chosen to take the tsar's throne. When Sobinin informs him that the Grand Council in Moscow has chosen a tsar, everyone celebrates.

Act 2
Poland

In a sumptuous hall, the nobility celebrates the Polish dominance over the Russians by singing and dancing.  Suddenly, a messenger comes in with the news that Mikhail Romanov has been selected as the tsar of Russia but is now in hiding.  The Poles vow to overthrow him.

Act 3
Susanin's cabin

Susanin and his adopted son, Vanya, pledge to defend the new tsar. Susanin blesses Sobinin and Antonida on their upcoming wedding when a detachment of Polish soldiers bursts in to demand the tsar's whereabouts. Instead, Susanin sends Vanya to warn the tsar while Susanin leads the soldiers off the trail into the woods. Antonida is devastated. Sobinin gathers some men to go on a rescue mission.

Act 4
A dense forest
 
Sobinin reassures his men of the rightness of their mission. When night falls,  in a part of the forest near a monastery, Vanya knocks at the gates and alerts the inhabitants to spirit the tsar away. Susanin has led the suspicious Polish troops into an impassable, snow-covered area of the forest. The Poles sleep while Susanin waits for the dawn and bids farewell to his children. A blizzard sets in, and when day breaks, the Poles awake.  They realise that Susanin has deceived them and so kill him.

Epilogue
Red Square, Moscow.

Across the stage walks a crowd of people, celebrating the triumph of the new tsar.  Alone in their own solemn procession, Antonida, Sobinin and Vanya mourn Susanin. A detachment of Russian troops comes upon them, discovers their connection with Susanin and comforts them.  As the scene changes to Red Square, the people proclaim glory to the tsar and to Susanin's memory.

Principal arias and numbers

Overture
Act 1
Cavatina and Rondo: "To the field, to the field," «В поле, в поле» (Antonida)
Act 2
Chorus: Polonaise, Полонез
Dance: Krakowiak, Краковяк
Dance: Waltz, Вальс
Dance: Mazurka, Мазурка
Act 3
Song: "When they killed the little bird's mother," «Как мать убили у малого птенца» (Vanya)
Act 4
Aria: "Brother in the darkness we are not able to find our enemy," No. 18; (Sobinine)
Aria: "They sense the truth!", «Чуют правду!» No. 21; (Susanin)

Epilogue
Chorus: "Glory, Glory to you, our Russian Tsar!", «Славься, славься, нашъ русскiй Царь!» (People)

Orchestral excerpts heard in the concert hall consist largely of the overture and the Polish numbers of the second act. Another excerpt that is also used by concert bands and military bands is the Slavsya finale arranged for wind band as a fanfare. It is famous for being used in the Moscow Victory Parade of 1945 and in other military parades since then. It is also a sung piece by choral groups. The finale piece was adapted for and has been also part of the repertoire of the world-famous Alexandrov Ensemble since 2004.

Instrumentation
The opera is scored for two flutes, two oboes (second oboe doubling cor anglais), two clarinets (in B flat and A), two bassoons, four horns, two clarino natural trumpets, three trombones, ophicleide, timpani, bells, harp, strings, as well as two offstage wind bands or concert bands, offstage clarinet in A, offstage chromatic (valved) trumpet, offstage drum, offstage bells. Some pieces are also scored for full orchestra, including the dance segments. The finale piece, another popular composition played in patriotic concerts and other events, can be also arranged for a full military band or concert band with the bells and chromatic trumpets and also for the Balalaika and the Bayan accordion, as heard in several cover versions.

Recordings
Source: operadis-opera-discography.org.uk

References

Sources
Annesley, Charles (pseudonym of Charles and Anna Tittmann) (1920). The Standard Operaglass: Detailed Plots of Two Hundred and Thirty-Five Celebrated Operas. Brentanos
Hodge, Thomas P.  (1998). "Susanin, Two Glinkas and Ryleev: History-Making in A Life for the Tsar" in Wachtel, Andrew  ed. Intersections and Transpositions: Russian Music, Literature, and Society. Northwestern University Press.  
Osborne, Charles (2007). The Opera Lover's Companion. Yale University Press.

External links

 
A digitized LP of the Danon recording featuring scans of the libretto in Russian and English

1836 operas
Operas set in the 17th century
Operas by Mikhail Glinka
Russian-language operas
Operas
Polish–Russian wars
Operas set in Russia
Operas set in Poland
Opera world premieres at the Bolshoi Theatre, Saint Petersburg